Botești is a commune in Neamț County, Western Moldavia, Romania. It is composed of three villages: Barticești, Botești and Nisiporești. It included four other villages until 2004, when they were split off to form Văleni Commune.

In 2002, the population was 95.2% ethnic Romanian and 4.7% Roma; 67.1% were Roman Catholic and 32.8% were Romanian Orthodox.

Natives
 Veronica Antal

References

Communes in Neamț County
Localities in Western Moldavia